= Murder in Maine law =

Murder in Maine law constitutes the intentional killing, under circumstances defined by law, of people within or under the jurisdiction of the U.S. state of Maine.

The United States Centers for Disease Control and Prevention reported that in the year 2020, the state had one of the lowest murder rates in the country.

== Penalties ==
| Offense | Mandatory sentencing |
|---|---|
| Manslaughter | Up to 30 years in prison |
| Felony Murder | Up to 30 years in prison |
| Murder | Life without parole or no less than 25 years |
